Tameka is a female given name. Notable people with the given name include:

Tameka Butt (born 1991), Australian football midfielder 
Tameka A. Clemons, American biochemist
Tameka Cottle (born 1975), American singer-songwriter
Tameka Empson (born 1977), British actress and comedian 
Tameka Foster (born 1971), American wardrobe stylist
Tameka Jameson (born 1989), American-Nigerian sprinter
Tameka Norris (born 1979), American artist 
Tameka Williams (born 1989), Saint Kitts and Nevis sprinter

Feminine given names